Eucanthus lazarus is a species of earth-boring scarab beetle in the family Geotrupidae. It is found in North America.

References

Further reading

 

Geotrupidae
Articles created by Qbugbot
Beetles described in 1775
Taxa named by Johan Christian Fabricius